is a Japanese manga series written and illustrated by Yūki Honda. It will be adapted into a live action film.

References

Crime in anime and manga
Hakusensha franchises
Hakusensha manga
Manga adapted into films
Seinen manga